Shirley Meyer (born December 9, 1952) is an American politician who served in the North Dakota House of Representatives from the 36th district from 1997 to 2000 and from 2004 to 2012.

References

1952 births
Living people
Democratic Party members of the North Dakota House of Representatives
Women state legislators in North Dakota
21st-century American women politicians
21st-century American politicians